Philips Telecommunicatie en Informatie Systemen (Philips Computers) was a subsidiary of Philips that designed and manufactured personal computers. Philips Computers was active from 1963 through 1992. Before that, Philips produced three computers between 1953 and 1956, all for internal use, PETER, STEVIN, and PASCAL.

Philips Computers was mostly known for its pioneer work in optical devices (through a separate subsidiary: LMSI). Philips computers were also sold under the Magnavox brand in North America. Two instances of Philips Computers products sold under other brands are known to date.

Philips computers were coupled with Philips monitors. Philips had far more success selling its monitors than its computers. Philips monitors continue being designed, produced and sold globally contemporaneously. Philips also had and has moderate success selling peripherals such as mice, keyboards and optical devices. Philips also sold and sells computer media such as diskettes and optical media (CD)s.

Philips also developed the CD-i standard but it flopped. Another experimental product was the Philips :YES, based on Intel's 80188. It also flopped.

Philips PCs were mostly equipped with motherboards designed by Philips Home Electronics in Montreal, Canada.

In the late 1990s Philips Pentium PCs were sold based on generic components and cases. These were not proprietarily designed and produced.

Philips had a subsidiary that sold the PCs under the Vendex brand: HeadStart. These systems were actively marketed in certain markets through Vendex. These systems were on display in the now defunct warehouse chain Vroom & Dreesmann in the Netherlands. Some HeadStart PCs were manufactured in South Korea by Samsung and monitors by Daewoo.

In the 2000s Philips briefly introduced a handheld PC: the Velo.

Products 
P 20 series Z80
Philips P 2000 C
Philips P 2000 M
Philips P 2000 T
Philips P 2010
Philips P 2012
Philips P 2015
P 21 series 8088
Philips P 2120 (desktop) (1990s green design)
P 22 series 286
Philips P 2230 (desktop) (1990s green design)
P 31 series 8088
Philips P 3100 (desktop) 
Philips P 3102 (desktop)
Philips P 3103 (desktop) (1980s red design) 
Philips P 3105 (desktop)
Philips P 3120 (desktop)
P 32 series 286
Philips P 3202 (desktop) (1980s red design)
Philips P 3204 (desktop) (1980s red design)
Philips P 3230 (desktop) (1980s red design)
Philips P 3238 (desktop) (1990s green design)
P 33 series 386
Philips P 3302 (not yet identified)
Philips P 3345 (desktop) (1990s green design)
Philips P 3348 (desktop) (1990s green design)
Philips P 3355 (desktop) (1990s green design)
Philips P 3360 (desktop) (1990s green design)
Philips P 3361 (desktop) (1990s green design)
Philips P 3370 (tower) (1990s green design)
Philips P 3371 (not yet identified)
P 34 series 486
Philips P 3460 (midi tower) (1990s green design)
Philips P 3464 (not yet identified)
Philips P 3470 (not yet identified)
Philips P 3471 (not yet identified)

NMS series 
Philips NMS 8250
Philips NMS 9100 8088 (desktop) (1980s red design)
Philips NMS 9100 AT 80286 (desktop) (1980s red design)
Philips NMS 9105 8088 (desktop) (1980s red design)
Philips NMS 9110 8088 (desktop) (1980s red design)
Philips NMS 9111 8088 (desktop) (1980s red design)
Philips NMS 9115 8088 (desktop) (1980s red design)
Philips NMS 9116 8088 (desktop) (1980s red design)
Philips NMS TC 100 8088 (desktop) (1990s green design)

PCD series (with CD-ROM) 
Philips PCD 102 (8088 desktop) (no CD-ROM)
Philips PCD 103 (8088 desktop) (no CD-ROM)
Philips PCD 200 (286) desktop) (no CD-ROM)
Philips PCD 203 (286 desktop) (no CD-ROM)
Philips PCD 204 (286 desktop)
Philips PCD 304 (386 desktop)
Philips PCD 308 (386 desktop)
Philips PCD 318 (386 desktop)

PCL series (notebook computers) 
Philips PCL 101 (8086 grey notebook)
Philips PCL 203 (80286 grey notebook)
Philips PCL 304 (80386 dark gray notebook)
Philips PCL 320 (80386 dark grey notebook)

Magnavox 
Magnavox M16034GY System 160
Magnavox M1101GY System 110
Magnavox M38044GY System 380
Magnavox M58044GY System 580SX
Magnavox Headstart 286 (286 1990s grey design desktop)
Magnavox Headstart 300 (286 1980s grey design desktop)
Magnavox Headstart 300 CD (286 1980s grey design desktop)
Magnavox Headstart 500 (386 1980s grey design desktop)
Magnavox Headstart 500 CD (386 1980s grey design desktop)
Magnavox Headstart 386 SX (386 1990s grey design desktop)
Magnavox Headstart 386 SX-16 (386 1990s grey design desktop)
Magnavox Headstart 386 SX/20 (386 1990s grey design desktop)
Magnavox Headstart 386/33 (386 (not yet identified)
Magnavox Headstart 486 SX (486 1990s grey design desktop)
Magnavox Headstart 486 DX (486 1990s grey design desktop)
Magnavox Magnum GL (not yet identified)
Magnavox Magnum SX (386sx/16 turbo)
Magnavox MaxStation 286 (not yet identified)
Magnavox MaxStation 386-SX (not yet identified)
Magnavox MaxStation 386SX/16 (not yet identified)
Magnavox MaxStation 380 (not yet identified)
Magnavox MaxStation 480 (not yet identified)
Magnavox Metalis SX/16 (386) (dark grey notebook)
Magnavox Metalis SX/20 (386) (dark grey notebook)
Magnavox Professional 386 SX-20 (386 1990s grey design desktop)
Magnavox Professional 386 DX-33 (386 1990s grey design desktop)

Philips Internal Reference (not sold) 
Avenger (sold as: MaxStation 286, Magnum GL, Headstart 300)
P 3212 (sold as: MaxStation 480, Headstart 380)
P 3239 (sold as: Headstart/MaxStation/Magnum/Professional 1200, 48CD, 1600, 64CD, P160, SR16CD)
P 3349 (sold as: Headstart/MaxStation/Magnum/Professional SX20, 80CD)
P 3345 (sold as: Magnavox/MaxStation 386SX, Magnum SX, Headstart Series 500)
P 3371 (sold as: Headstart/MaxStation/Magnum/Professional 3300)

Third Parties 
Wang LE 150 (8088 based on P 3105 desktop)
Argent Technologies 286 (desktop, not yet confirmed)
Argent Technologies 386 SX (desktop, not yet confirmed)
Argent Technologies 386 DX (desktop, not yet confirmed)
Argent Technologies 486 DX 33 (486 based on P 3355 desktop)
Argent Technologies 486 MT (mini tower, not yet confirmed)

Vendex HeadStart 
HeadStart Turbo 888 XT, 8088 desktop.
HeadStart Explorer, 8088 Amiga 500 style.
HeadStart Plus, 8088 desktop.
HeadStart LX-40, 8088 desktop.
HeadStart LX-CD, 8088 desktop with CD-ROM.
HeadStart II, 8088 desktop.
HeadStart III, 286 desktop (made in Korea).
HeadStart III CD, 286 desktop with CD-ROM.
HeadStart Pro, 286 & 386.

Monitors – Magnavox / Philips 
These monitors were sold / shipped with Magnavox / Philips PCs:
20CM64: 20" VGA color CRT
3CM9809: 14" VGA color CRT
7BM623: 12" TTL CRT
7BM749: 14" VGA monochrome CRT
7CM321: 14" VGA color CRT
8CM643: 12" TTL CRT
9CM053: 14" CGA/EGA color CRT
9CM062: 14" VGA color CRT
9CM073: 14" CGA/EGA color CRT
9CM082: 14" VGA color CRT
BM7622: 12" TTL CRT
CM2080: 14" color CRT for Macintosh
CM2089: 14" VGA color CRT
CM2099: 14" VGA color CRT
CM4015: 15" VGA color CRT
CM4017: 17" VGA color CRT
CM8502: 12" TTL CRT
CM8552: 12" TTL CRT
CM8762: 12" TTL CRT
CM8833: 12" TTL CRT
CM9032: 14" VGA color CRT
CM9043: 12" TTL CRT

Monitors – Vendex 
These monitors were sold / shipped with Vendex PCs:
M-888-C: CGA CRT: shipped with the HeadStart LX-40.
M-888-VC: VGA color CRT: shipped with the HeadStart III
M-888-MV: VGA monochrome CRT: shipped with the HeadStart III
M-1031-CVGA: VGA CRT color: shipped with the HeadStart III

Peripherals 
Philips P 2813 keyboard: shipped with PCs with 8088 through 386 processors (also shipped with Magnavox logo)
Philips P 2814 keyboard: shipped with PCs with 286 and up processors (also shipped with Magnavox logo)
Philips serial mouse, FCC ID FSU4VVGMZAS: shipped with PCs with 8088 through 386 processors (not clear whether also shipped with Magnavox logo)
Philips NMS 1140 mouse: shipped with MSX systems
Philips NMS 1445 mouse: shipped with PCs with 8088 processors (not clear whether also shipped with Magnavox logo)

References 

Philips